Pierre-Édouard Blondin,  (December 14, 1874 – October 29, 1943) was a Canadian politician.

Biography
He was born on December 14, 1874.

He was elected to the House of Commons of Canada representing the Quebec riding of Champlain in 1908 and 1911. A Conservative, he was defeated in Laurier—Outremont during the 1917 wartime election held during the Conscription Crisis of 1917 when conscription was highly unpopular in Quebec.

He held many cabinet positions in Sir Robert Borden's Cabinet, including Postmaster General, Minister of Mines, Secretary of State of Canada, and  Minister of Inland Revenue. As well, he was Deputy Speaker and Chairman of Committees of the Whole of the House of Commons.

In March 1917, he resigned his position as Postmaster General of Canada to become a Lieutenant-Colonel in the Canadian Army. He then went on a recruitment tour in a bid to get more French Canadians to join the war effort.

In 1918, he was called to the Senate of Canada, representing the senatorial division of The Laurentides, Quebec, and was re-appointed to the Cabinet as Postmaster General of Canada. From 1930 to 1936, he was the Speaker of the Senate of Canada.

He died in office on October 29, 1943.

External links

1874 births
1943 deaths
Conservative Party of Canada (1867–1942) MPs
Members of the House of Commons of Canada from Quebec
Members of the King's Privy Council for Canada
Quebec lieutenants
Canadian senators from Quebec
Speakers of the Senate of Canada